Poirieria is a genus of large predatory sea snails, marine gastropod molluscs in the subfamily Pagodulinae of the family Muricidae, the rock snails.

Species 
Species within the genus Poirieria include:
 † Poirieria delli P. A. Maxwell, 1971 
 †  Poirieria denticulifera P. A. Maxwell, 1971 
 Poirieria kopua Dell, 1956
 † Poirieria parva P. A. Maxwell, 1971 
 † Poirieria primigena Finlay, 1930 
 Poirieria syrinx Marshall & Houart, 1995
 Poirieria zelandica (Quoy & Gaimard, 1833)

 Synonymized species
 Poirieria actinophora (Dall, 1889):: synonym of Actinotrophon actinophorus (Dall, 1889)
 Poirieria azami Kuroda, 1929: synonym of Murexsul multispinosus (G. B. Sowerby III, 1904)
 Poirieria bowdenensis  E. H. Vokes, 1970 : synonym of Pazinotus bowdenensis (Vokes, 1970)
 Poirieria fragilis Houart, 1996:: synonym of Actinotrophon fragilis (Houart, 1996)
 Poirieria kurranulla Garrard, 1961: synonym of Chicoreus longicornis (Dunker, 1864)
 Poirieria stimpsonii (Dall, 1889) : synonym of Pazinotus stimpsonii (Dall, 1889)
 Poirieria tenuis Houart, 2001:: synonym of Actinotrophon tenuis (Houart, 2001)
 Poirieria velero Vokes, 1970: synonym of Calotrophon velero (Vokes, 1970) (original combination)
 Poirieria (Panamurex) carnicolor (Clench & Pérez Farfante, 1945) : synonym of Calotrophon carnicolor (Clench & Pérez Farfante, 1945)
 Poirieria (Panamurex) eugeniae Vokes, 1992  : synonym of Calotrophon eugeniae (Vokes, 1992)
 Poirieria (Paziella) acerapex Houart, 1986 : synonym of  Leptotrophon acerapex (Houart, 1986)
 Poirieria (Paziella) atlantis (Clench & Farfante, 1945) : synonym of Paziella atlantis (Clench & Farfante, 1945)
 Poirieria (Paziella) galapagana (Emerson & D'Attilio, 1970) : synonym of Paziella galapagana (Emerson & D'Attilio, 1970)
 Poirieria (Paziella) nuttingi' (Dall, 1896)   : synonym of Paziella nuttingi (Dall, 1896)
 Poirieria (Paziella) oregonia (Bullis, 1964) : synonym of Paziella oregonia (Bullis, 1964)
 Poirieria (Paziella) pazi (Crosse, 1869) : synonym of Paziella pazi (Crosse, 1869)
 Poirieria (Paziella) petuchi Vokes, 1992 : synonym of Paziella petuchi (Vokes, 1992)
 Poirieria (Paziella) spinacutus Houart, 1986 : synonym of Leptotrophon spinacutus (Houart, 1986)
 Poirieria (Paziella) tanaoa Houart & Tröndlé, 2008 : synonym of Paziella tanaoa (Houart & Tröndlé, 2008)
 Poirieria (Paziella) vaubanensis Houart, 1986 : synonym of  Bouchetia vaubanensis (Houart, 1986)
 Poirieria (Pazinotus) bodarti Costa, 1993: synonym of Pazinotus bodarti (Costa, 1993)

 References 

 Glen Pownall, New Zealand Shells and Shellfish, Seven Seas Publishing Pty Ltd, Wellington, New Zealand 1979 
  Marshall, B.A., Houart, R. 1995. A revision of the genus Poirieria Jousseaume, 1880 (Mollusca: Gastropoda: Muricidae) with description of a new species. The Nautilus 108: 27 - 33.

External links
 ITIS
 Powell A W B, New Zealand Mollusca'', William Collins Publishers Ltd, Auckland, New Zealand 1979 
  Barco, A.; Marshall, B.; Houart, R.; Oliverio, M. (2015). Molecular phylogenetics of Haustrinae and Pagodulinae (Neogastropoda: Muricidae) with a focus on New Zealand species

 
Muricidae
Gastropod genera
Gastropods described in 1880
Taxa named by Félix Pierre Jousseaume